Orlovo is a rural locality (a selo) in Nemetsky National District, Altai Krai, Russia. The population was 1,439 as of 2013. There are 6 streets.

Geography 
Orlovo is located 21 km northeast of Galbshtadt (the district's administrative centre) by road. Dvorskoye and Alexandrovka are the nearest rural localities.

References 

Rural localities in Nemetsky National District